The Boyer River (Rivière Boyer in French) is a tributary of Chenal des Grands Voiliers, on the south shore of Saint Lawrence River.

The lower part of this valley is served by the route 132 which runs along the southeast bank of the St. Lawrence River, and also by the road of the second range West (which becomes Rang Nord-Est and Avenue Royale, further south), Chemin du 3e rang Ouest (which becomes Chemin du rang Sud-Est, further south).

Apart from a few forest areas crossed by the river, agriculture is the main economic activity in this valley.

The surface of the Boyer River is generally frozen from the beginning of December until the end of March, except the rapids areas; however, safe circulation on the ice is generally done from mid-December to mid-March. The water level of the river varies with the seasons and the precipitation; the spring flood occurs in March or April.

Geography 
The Boyer River rises at the confluence of the Boyer North River and Boyer South River rivers, at Saint-Charles-de-Bellechasse. This source is located in range Nord-Ouest 4.8 km south-west of the center of the village of Saint-Charles-de-Bellechasse, south-east of Plée de Saint-Charles and 1, 3 km northeast of the limit of Saint-Henri.

From its source, the Boyer River flows 34.0 km, divided into the following segments:
 5.6 km (or 3.0 km in a straight line) to the northeast, meandering to route 279;
 7.4 km (or 3.7 km in a straight line) to the northeast, meandering from the south side of the village of Saint-Charles-de-Bellechasse to the road bridge connecting the route 218 and the road along the southeast side of the river;
 7.4 km (3.7 km in a straight line) to the northeast, collecting the waters of Portage brook and winding up to the limit between the municipalities of Saint-Charles-de-Bellechasse and Saint-Michel-de-Bellechasse;
 6.4 km (or 3.9 km in a straight line) to the northeast, to the route 281 bridge;
 4.3 km (or 2.0 km in a straight line) towards the north-east, passing through the north-west of the village of La Durantaye, up to the highway 20;
 2.9 km north-east, to its confluence. The last 1.9 km segment forms the boundary between the municipalities of Saint-Michel-de-Bellechasse and Saint-Vallier.

The Boyer river flows onto the long shore of the Saint-Vallier bank, in the Saint-Vallier cove, on the south bank of the Saint Lawrence River. This confluence is located on the west side of the village of Saint-Vallier, on the east side of the village of Saint-Michel-de-Bellechasse and opposite the village of Saint-Jean-de-l'Île-d'Orléans located on Île d'Orléans. This confluence is located east of the confluence of the Mothers river and the Bellechasse stream.

Its main tributaries are:
 Boyer River North,
 Boyer River South,
 Portage stream.

Toponymy 
The toponym "rivière Boyer" was officialized on December 5, 1968, at the Commission de toponymie du Québec.

See also 
 St. Lawrence River
 Chenal des Grands Voiliers
 Boyer River North, a stream
 Boyer River South, a stream
 Portage Creek, a stream
 Saint-Charles-de-Bellechasse, a municipality
 Saint-Michel-de-Bellechasse, a municipality
 Saint-Vallier, a municipality
 Bellechasse Regional County Municipality (MRC)
 List of rivers of Quebec

References 

Rivers of Chaudière-Appalaches
Tributaries of the Saint Lawrence River